Maciej Zięba (born January 24, 1987) is a Polish-German footballer who plays for German club SC Düsseldorf-West.

External links

1987 births
Living people
Polish footballers
German people of Polish descent
Bayer 04 Leverkusen II players
Wuppertaler SV players
SV Wehen Wiesbaden players
3. Liga players
Regionalliga players
Association football midfielders
People from Polkowice County